Suphanan Bureerat (born 10 October 1993) is a Thai professional footballer who plays as a right back for Thai League 1 club Port and the Thailand national team.

International career
In 2022, he was called up for the 2022 AFF Championship by Head Coach Alexandré Pölking.

International Goals
Scores and results list Thailand's goal tally first.

Personal Life 
Suphanan is a Christian with a tattoo "Love Jesus" on his left-side neck.

Honours

International
Thailand
 AFF Championship (1): 2022

References

1993 births
Living people
Suphanan Bureerat
Suphanan Bureerat
Suphanan Bureerat
Association football defenders
Suphanan Bureerat
Suphanan Bureerat
Suphanan Bureerat
Suphanan Bureerat
Suphanan Bureerat
Suphanan Bureerat